Gert Hansen (born 27 October 1937) is a Danish footballer. He played in two matches for the Denmark national football team in 1961.

References

External links
 

1937 births
Living people
Danish men's footballers
Denmark international footballers
Place of birth missing (living people)
Association footballers not categorized by position